The Scheldeprijs is a cycling race in Flanders and the Netherlands which starts in Terneuzen, crosses the Scheldt River, and finishes in Schoten. Until 2018 it was held entirely in Belgium. The event, ranked as a 1.HC race on the UCI Europe Tour, features mostly sprinters on its roll of honour, as it is held on all-flat roads over roughly 200 kilometres.

First held in 1907, it is the oldest still-existing cycling event in Flanders, notably six years older than the Tour of Flanders monument race. The race had its only interruptions during both World Wars and celebrated its 100th edition in 2012. German sprinter Marcel Kittel holds the record with five wins.

Since 2021, a women's edition of Scheldeprijs is held on the same day as the men's race, starting and finishing in Schoten, approximately 136 kilometres in distance. Lorena Wiebes won the inaugural edition.

History
The first Scheldeprijs was organised by the Antwerp branch of the Belgian cycling federation (BWB) on July 8, 1907 – making it the oldest cycling race in Flanders. In its early years it started and ended in Antwerp, finishing at the now demolished Zurenborg velodrome. Later the start moved to Merksem and then Deurne, on the outskirts of Antwerp. In 1996, the start moved back to the centre of Antwerp. The inaugural race in 1907 was won by Frenchman Maurice Léturgie. It would be 46 years before another non-Belgian – Dutchman Hans Dekkers – triumphed in 1953.

From the 1980s until 2009, the race was held in mid-April on the Wednesday following Paris–Roubaix. In 2010, when the Scheldeprijs was purchased by Flanders Classics, the event swapped dates with Gent–Wevelgem and has since been held on the Wednesday between the Tour of Flanders and Paris–Roubaix. It has formerly been known as Scheldeprijs Schoten and Scheldeprijs Vlaanderen. Since 2010, the race is simply known as Scheldeprijs.

Prominent winners include Eddy Merckx, Rik Van Looy, Mario Cipollini, Freddy Maertens, Roger De Vlaeminck, Erik Zabel, Briek Schotte, Stan Ockers, Georges Ronsse, Mark Cavendish, and Tom Boonen. German sprinter Marcel Kittel holds the record for most wins with five victories between 2012 and 2017. Belgian classics specialist Johan Museeuw, who finished second in 1992 and 1997, chose the 2004 event as his final race, saying, "I could have retired after Paris–Roubaix but I felt it important that my last race should be in Belgium. The Scheldeprijs is a great race and I especially love the start on Antwerp's market place."

Route
The current route, starting with the 2018 edition, rolls out from Terneuzen, then passes through the Western Scheldt Tunnel before racing starts near Ellewoutsdijk. It takes a 129.8 kilometre tour of the islands of Walcheren, North and South Beveland in the province of Zeeland in the Netherlands before crossing the border into Belgium, taking three laps on a local circuit and finishing at Churchilllaan in Schoten.

The previous race course consisted of one 155 kilometres  lap in the countryside of Antwerp province followed by three smaller laps of 15 kilometres in and around Schoten. That route included seven cobbled sections varying between 1300 and 3000 metres. The race had a neutralised start on the banks of the River Schelde in the centre of Antwerp at the Grote Markt outside the City Hall. Racing begins in Schoten, a few kilometres north east. The finish was outside Schoten town hall.

Due to the COVID-19 pandemic, the 2020 edition was postponed from the spring to 14 October, and a revised route of 10 laps around Schoten planned, remaining entirely in Belgian territory.

Men's Winners
The following cyclists have won the race:

Multiple winners

Wins per country

Women's Winners

Wins per country

References

External links
 

 
Cycle races in Belgium
UCI Europe Tour races
Recurring sporting events established in 1907
1907 establishments in Belgium
Annual sporting events in Belgium
Classic cycle races
Spring (season) events in Belgium
Women's road bicycle races